The Tour de Luxembourg is an annual stage race in professional road bicycle racing held in Luxembourg. The Tour de Luxembourg is classified as a 2.Pro race, the highest rating below the World Tour, by the Union Cycliste Internationale (UCI), the sport's governing body. In 2006, the Tour became part of the UCI Europe Tour, and became part of the UCI ProSeries in 2020. Primarily held in late May to early June, the event was sometimes used by riders as a preparation race for the Tour de France.

In his 2021 autobiography Væddeløber, the 2014 winner Matti Breschel “revealed” that his overall victory was partly facilitated by on the final stage motivating riders of another team by the promise of a 1000 € each gain if succeeding in keeping contact with the breakaway

Winners

References

External links

 
Cycle races in Luxembourg
UCI Europe Tour races
Recurring sporting events established in 1935
1935 establishments in Luxembourg
Summer events in Luxembourg